Szczawno may refer to the following places:
Szczawno, Kuyavian-Pomeranian Voivodeship (north-central Poland)
Szczawno, Łódź Voivodeship (central Poland)
Szczawno, Lubusz Voivodeship (west Poland)
Szczawno, West Pomeranian Voivodeship (north-west Poland)